Panoth Weir is a small diversion dam across Vaniyam puzha which is a tributary of Mahe puzha at Panoth in Naripatta panchayath in Vilangad village of Kozhikode district in Kerala, India. It is the second weir of Vilangad SHEP. It is located at Panoth near Vilangad in Vadakara taluk of Kozhikode district.

Power Project
It is a 7.5 MW (3 x 2.50 MW) power project built on Vaniyampuzha and Kavadipuzha, the tributaries of Mahe river, with an investment of Rs 59.49 crore INR. The project consists of dams at Panoth and Valookku and two canals (1750 meter long Valook Canal and 2850 meter long Panoth canal) and a fore-bay tank with a penstock pipe.  This Along with three 2.5 MW generators creates the Power and the water flows through a 124-meter tailrace channel. The power generated is conveyed to Nadapuram substation which is 14 kilometers away from the power house.

Specifications

External links
Vilangad Small Hydro Electric Project

References 

Dams in Kerala
Dams completed in 2014